Marek Paul Reichman (born 1966) is an English industrial designer currently working as Chief Creative Officer and studio head at Aston Martin.

Early life and education
Reichman was born in Sheffield, then in the West Riding of Yorkshire. to an English mother and Polish father who immigrated from Poland, was a blacksmith, and his family were car fanatics, sparking his interest in industrial design. He graduated from Teesside University in Middlesbrough with a 1st class Honours degree in Industrial Design, and then studied Vehicle Design at the Royal College of Art in London, as the first Land Rover student.

Career
He started his career in 1991 with Rover Cars. In 1995, after Rover's takeover by BMW, he moved to BMW Designworks in California, eventually becoming Senior Designer and leading the design direction of Land Rover future production models, the most significant of which was the 2003 Range Rover (L322). In May 2005, he became Director of Design for Aston Martin.

In 2008, by invitation, he became an assistant professor at the Royal College of Art.

Portfolio

His works include the Aston Martin One-77, the DBS, the Rapide, the 2012 Aston Martin Vanquish, the Aston Martin Vulcan, the Rolls-Royce Phantom VII, the Lincoln MKX Concept and Navicross Concept Cars.

In June 2014, the Aston Martin DP-100 was unveiled, which is a concept car designed for the video game Gran Turismo 6. In 2015 Reichman directed the design of the Aston Martin DB10 concept car, used in the James Bond film Spectre.

Honours
Reichman was awarded an honorary doctorate by Teesside University in 2011.

Background
"My father worked as a blacksmith, which is why I grew up with knowledge of making things. It’s where I picked up my artistic skills, and realised that design surrounds us, whether it’s through a traditional method of designing or through a craft. Design is integral to the human race. My father is Polish, and my mother is English. I grew up in a family with many car fanatics. I wanted to be an industrial designer, to learn the science behind materials, so I studied industrial design to get the knowledge base."

References

1966 births
Living people
Aston Martin
English industrial designers
British automobile designers
People from Sheffield
British people of Polish descent